The following is a list of notable Lehi members. Twenty percent of Lehi members were women. Many notable Lehi members were originally Irgun members.

Members 

 Yaakov Banai, commander of Lehi's combat unit
 Shaltiel Ben-Yair
 Eliyahu Bet-Zuri
 Geula Cohen, member of the Knesset
 Israel Eldad, leader in the Israeli national camp
 Boaz Evron, left-wing journalist
 Maxim Ghilan, Israeli journalist, author and peace activist
 Eliyahu Giladi
 Uri Zvi Greenberg
 Eliyahu Hakim
 Amos Kenan, writer
 Baruch Korff
 Yitzhak Shamir, Israeli prime minister 1983–1984 and 1986–1992.
 Avraham Stern
 Shimon Tzabar
 Natan Yellin-Mor, member of the Knesset 1949–1951, leftist advocate of peace with Arabs.

Commanders 
 Juli Torenberg-Elasar, commander of the women's group
 Tzelnik Yitzhak "Shimon", commander of Lehi in Jerusalem in 1941-1942 (before Avraham Stern's murder)
 Shpilman Anshel "Aryeh", notable commander who left Irgun, and was subsequently involved with many major Lehi operations
 Shomron Sovol Tzfoni, intelligence coordinator, head of training department, member of operations headquarters

See also 
 List of Lehi operations
 Jewish insurgency in Mandatory Palestine
 List of Irgun members

External links 
 Lehi biographies and interviews
 Jewish Women's Archive Lehi members

References 

Lehi (militant group)
Terrorism in Mandatory Palestine
Zionist terrorism
Mandatory Palestine in World War II